Monica Seles was the defending champion and won in the final 6–3, 5–7, 6–2 against Jennifer Capriati.

Seeds
A champion seed is indicated in bold text while text in italics indicates the round in which that seed was eliminated. The top two seeds received a bye to the second round.

  Monica Seles (champion)
  Jennifer Capriati (final)
  Amanda Coetzer (second round)
  Amy Frazier (first round)
  Lisa Raymond (quarterfinals)
  Ai Sugiyama (first round)
  Cara Black (first round)
  Kristina Brandi (withdrew)

Draw

Final

Section 1

Section 2

References
 2001 IGA U.S. Indoor Championships Draw

U.S. National Indoor Championships
2001 WTA Tour